Ben Mehdi  is a town and commune in El Taref Province, Algeria.

References

Communes of El Taref Province